The 1970–71 Bulgarian Hockey League season was the 19th season of the Bulgarian Hockey League, the top level of ice hockey in Bulgaria. Six teams participated in the league, and HK CSKA Sofia won the championship.

Standings

External links
 Season on hockeyarchives.info

Bulgar
Bulgarian Hockey League seasons
Bulg